The United States secretary of state is a member of the executive branch of the federal government of the United States and the head of the U.S. Department of State. The office holder is one of the highest ranking members of the president's Cabinet, and ranks the first in the U.S. presidential line of succession among Cabinet secretaries.

Created in 1789 with Thomas Jefferson as its first office holder, the secretary of state represents the United States to foreign countries, and is therefore considered analogous to a foreign minister in other countries. The secretary of state is nominated by the president of the United States and, following a confirmation hearing before the Senate Committee on Foreign Relations, is confirmed by the United States Senate. The secretary of state, along with the secretary of the treasury, secretary of defense, and attorney general, are generally regarded as the four most crucial Cabinet members because of the importance of their respective departments.

Secretary of State is a Level I position in the Executive Schedule and thus earns the salary prescribed for that level (US$221,400, as of January 2021). The current secretary of state is Antony Blinken, who was confirmed on January 26, 2021, by the Senate by a vote of 78–22.

History 
The secretary of state originates from the government under the Articles of Confederation. The Congress of the Confederation established the Department of Foreign Affairs in 1781 and created the office of secretary of foreign affairs. After the Constitution of the United States was ratified, the 1st United States Congress reestablished the department, renaming it the Department of State, and created the office of secretary of state to lead the department.

Duties and responsibilities

The stated duties of the secretary of state are to supervise the United States foreign service and immigration policy and administer the Department of State. The secretary must also advise the president on U.S. foreign matters such as the appointment of diplomats and ambassadors, advising the president of the dismissal and recall of these people. The secretary of state can conduct negotiations, interpret, and terminate treaties relating to foreign policy. The secretary also can participate in international conferences, organizations, and agencies as a representative of the United States. The secretary communicates issues relating to the U.S. foreign policy to Congress and citizens. The secretary also provides services to U.S. citizens living or traveling abroad such as providing credentials in the form of passports. Doing this, the secretary also ensures the protection of citizens, their property, and interests in foreign countries.

Secretaries of state also have domestic responsibilities, entrusted in 1789, when the position was first created. These include the protection and custody of the Great Seal of the United States, and the preparation of some presidential proclamations. In the process of extraditing fugitives to or from the country, the secretary serves as the channel of communication between foreign governments, the federal government, and the states.

Most of the domestic functions of the Department of State were gradually transferred to other agencies by the late 19th century as part of various administrative reforms and restructurings. Those that remain include storage and use of the Great Seal, performance of protocol functions for the White House, and the drafting of certain proclamations. The secretary also negotiates with the individual states over the extradition of fugitives to foreign countries. Under federal law, the resignation of a president or of a vice president is valid only if declared in writing, in an instrument delivered to the office of the secretary of state. Accordingly, the resignations of President Richard Nixon and of Vice President Spiro Agnew were formalized in instruments delivered to then-Secretary of State Henry Kissinger.

Although they have historically decreased over time, Congress may occasionally add to the responsibilities of the secretary of state. One such instance occurred in 2014, when Congress passed the Sean and David Goldman International Child Abduction Prevention and Return Act which mandated actions the Secretary of State must take in order to facilitate the return of abducted children from nations who are party to the Hague Convention on the Civil Aspects of International Child Abduction. 

As the highest-ranking member of the cabinet, the secretary of state is the third-highest official of the executive branch of the U.S. federal government, after the president and vice president, and is fourth in line to succeed the presidency, after the vice president, the speaker of the House of Representatives, and the president pro tempore of the Senate.

Six past secretaries of stateJefferson, Madison, Monroe, John Quincy Adams, Van Buren and Buchananhave gone on to be elected president. Others, including Henry Clay, Daniel Webster, Lewis Cass, John C. Calhoun, John M. Clayton, William L. Marcy, William Seward, Edward Everett, Jeremiah S. Black, James Blaine, Elihu B. Washburne, Thomas F. Bayard, John Sherman, Walter Q. Gresham, William Jennings Bryan, Philander C. Knox, Charles Evans Hughes, Elihu Root, Cordell Hull, Edmund Muskie, Alexander Haig, John Kerry, and Hillary Clinton have also campaigned as presidential candidates, either before or after their term of office as Secretary of State, but were ultimately unsuccessful. The position of Secretary of State has therefore been viewed to be a consolation prize for failed presidential candidates.

See also
List of secretaries of state of the United States
List of international trips made by secretaries of state of the United States

References

Bibliography

Further reading 
 Bemis, Samuel Flagg, ed. (1963) The American Secretaries of State and Their Diplomacy (19 vols.), scholarly biographies
 Graebner, Norman A., ed. (1961) An Uncertain Tradition: American Secretaries of State in the Twentieth Century scholarly essays on John Hay through John Foster Dulles.
 Hopkins, Michael F. (2008) "President Harry Truman's Secretaries of State: Stettinius, Byrnes, Marshall and Acheson" Journal of Transatlantic Studies v.6 n.3 pp. 290–304.
 Mihalkanin, Edward, ed. (2004) online American Statesmen: Secretaries of State from John Jay to Colin Powell short scholarly articles by experts

External links

|-

|-

United States Department of State
 
State
United States diplomacy
1789 establishments in the United States